Ioannes VII (Iōannēs Ζ') may refer to:

 Patriarch John VII of Constantinople (mid-9th century)
 Emperor John VII Palaiologos (1370–1408)

See also
 John VII (disambiguation)